African and Asian Studies is a peer-reviewed academic journal covering research on Africa and Asia. It covers aspects of anthropology, sociology, history, political science and related social sciences about African and Asian societies and cultures and their relationships. From 1966 to 2001 this journal was published under the name of Journal of African and Asian Studies.

According to the Journal Citation Reports, the journal has a 2021 impact factor of 0.250. The editor-in-chief is Tukumbi Lumumba-Kasongo (Wells College).

Abstracting and indexing 
The journal is abstracted and indexed in:
 Geobase
 Scopus
 MLA - Modern Language Association Database
 Worldwide Political Science Abstracts
 Historical Abstracts
 SCImago

External links

References

Asian studies journals
African studies journals
Brill Publishers academic journals
Publications established in 2002
Quarterly journals
English-language journals